The Bay of Arabat,, is in the southwestern Azov Sea in eastern Europe.

It is located along the northwestern coast of the Kerch Peninsula and northeastern coast of Crimea.

See also
 Arabat Spit
 Geography of Crimea

External links
 The Arabat Tragedy

Bays of Crimea
Kerch Peninsula
Bays of the Sea of Azov